This is a list of Orders, decorations, and medals of Austria-Hungary.

Orders

 Order of the Golden Fleece (Orden vom Goldenen Vlies)
 Military Order of Maria Theresa (Militär-Maria Theresien-Orden)
 Royal Hungarian Order of Saint Stephen (Königlich Ungarischer St. Stephans-Orden)
 Order of the Starry Cross (Hochadeliger Frauenzimmer-Sternkreuzorden)
 Austrian Imperial Order of Leopold (Österreichisch-kaiserlicher Leopolds-Orden)
 Austrian Imperial Order of the Iron Crown (Österreichisch-kaiserlicher Orden der Eisernen Krone)
 Austrian Imperial Order of Elizabeth (Kaiserlich österreichischer Elisabeth-Orden)
 Imperial Austrian Order of Franz Joseph (Kaiserlich-österreichischer Franz Joseph-Orden)

Decorations and medals

The following decorations and medals are listed in their order of wear from 1908.
 Military Merit Cross (Militärverdienstkreuz)
 Decoration of the Elizabeth-Theresian Military Foundation (Dekoration der Elisabeth Theresien-Militärstiftung)
 Military Merit Medal (Signum Laudis) (Militär-Verdienstmedaille (Signum Laudis))
 Merit Cross for Military Chaplains (Das Geistliche Verdienstkreuz)
 Bravery Medal (Tapferkeitsmedaille)
 Civil Cross of Merit (Zivil-Verdienstkreuz)
 War Medal 1873 (Kriegsmedaille 1873)
Commemorative Medal for the 1864 Campaign in Denmark (Erinnerungsmedaille an den Feldzug 1864 in Dänemark)
Commemorative Medals for the Defenders of the Tyrol 1848, 1859 and 1866 (Denkmünzen für die Tiroler Landesverteidiger 1848, 1859 und 1866)
 Military Long Service Crosses for Officers (Militärdienstzeichen für Offiziere)
 Medal for 40 years Faithful Service (Ehrenmedaille für 40jährige treue Dienste)
 Military Long Service Crosses for Enlisted (Militärdienstzeichen für Unteroffiziere)
 Jubilee Court Medal (Jubiläumshofmedaille)
 Jubilee Medal for the Armed Forces (Jubiläumserinnerungsmedaille für die bewaffnete Macht)
 Jubilee Medal for civil state servants (Jubiläumserinnerungsmedaille für Zivilstaatsbedienstete)
 1908 Jubilee Cross (Jubiläumskreuz 1908)
 Sea Voyage Medal 1892-1893 (Seereise-Denkmünze 1892-1893)
 Fire Service Medal (Feuerwehrmedaille)

Medals not in the 1908 order of wear, in order of year of establishment
Army Cross 1813/14 (Cannon Cross) (Armeekreuz 1813/14 (Kanonenkreuz)) - 1814
 Bosnia-Hercegovina Service Medal (Bosnisch-Hercegovinische Erinnerungsmedaille) - 1909
 Mobilization Cross 1912/13 (Mobilisierungskreuz 1912/13) - 1913
 Decoration for Services to the Red Cross (Ehrenzeichen für Verdienste um das Rote Kreuz) - 1914
War Cross for Civil Merits (Kriegskreuz für Zivildienste) - 1915
 Karl Troop Cross (Karl-Truppenkreuz) - 1916
 Wound Medal (Verwundetenmedaille) - 1917
 Civil Merit Medal (Zivilverdienstmedaille) - 1918

See also
Orders, decorations, and medals of Austria

References